Annepona mariae  is a species of sea snail, a cowry, a marine gastropod mollusk in the family Cypraeidae, the cowries. The species was named after German malacologist Maria Schilder.

Description
The oval, porcellaneous shell is 9–20 mm in size. It is white in color with small yellow or olive blotches in a ring on the dorsum and on the sides. The extremities of the shell are hardly produced.

Distribution
This species occurs from eastern Africa to northern Australia, the Philippines, the central Pacific Ocean, including the Solomons, Tonga, Hawaii and the Tuamotu Archipelago.

References

External links
 Cypraea mariae Information and picture
 On-line articles with Cypraea mariae in the HAWAIIAN SHELL NEWS (1960-1994)

Cypraeidae
Gastropods described in 1927